The 1984–85 Notre Dame Fighting Irish men's basketball team represented the University of Notre Dame during the 1984-85 college basketball season. The Irish were led by head coach Digger Phelps, in his 14th season, and played their home games at the Athletic & Convocation Center in Notre Dame, Indiana. Notre Dame earned an at-large bid to the NCAA tournament as the No. 7 seed in the Southeast region. After an opening round win over Oregon State, the Irish were beaten by No. 2 seed North Carolina in the round of 32. The team finished with a 21–9 record.

Roster

Schedule and results

|-
!colspan=9 style=| Regular Season

|-
!colspan=9 style=| NCAA Tournament

Rankings

References

Notre Dame Fighting Irish men's basketball seasons
Notre Dame
Notre Dame
Notre Dame Fighting Irish
Notre Dame Fighting Irish